Félipe Briones (born 17 November 1950) is a Chilean alpine skier. He competed in three events at the 1968 Winter Olympics.

References

1950 births
Living people
Chilean male alpine skiers
Olympic alpine skiers of Chile
Alpine skiers at the 1968 Winter Olympics
Sportspeople from Santiago
20th-century Chilean people